Medyn is a town and the administrative center of Medynsky District in Kaluga Oblast, Russia, located on the Medynka River (Oka basin),  northwest of Kaluga, the administrative center of the oblast. Population:

History
It was first mentioned in 1386, when it passed from the Principality of Smolensk to the Grand Duchy of Moscow. The village of Medynskoye was granted town status in 1776.

Administrative and municipal status
Within the framework of administrative divisions, Medyn serves as the administrative center of Medynsky District, to which it is directly subordinated. As a municipal division, the town of Medyn is incorporated within Medynsky Municipal District as Medyn Urban Settlement.

Military

References

Notes

Sources

External links

Cities and towns in Kaluga Oblast
Medynsky Uyezd